Chris Groom (born 28 August 1973) is a former Australian rules footballer who played for the Adelaide Football Club, Fremantle Football Club and North Melbourne Football Club in the Australian Football League (AFL).

Career
After a very successful junior career for South Adelaide that included playing in the 1990 under-17 SANFL premiership and the 1991 reserves premiership (aged 17), Chris was selected by Adelaide during the moratorium where the club had the first 8 picks of South Australian players before other clubs could select (1992). At the age of 18, Groom made his debut for South Adelaide's Seniors in round 1, 1992 playing against Glenelg and kicked 5 goals. He finished the year with 42 goals from 25 games in a year where South Adelaide made the finals.
In 1992, Chris made his AFL debut in round 1 against , kicking 2 goals. After being plagued by illness and injury he was traded to Fremantle for the 1995 season and played in Fremantle's first ever game, kicking 3 goals. In exchange for Groom, Fremantle traded the rights to Andrew McLeod to Adelaide, a move for which Fremantle have been roundly criticised, as a result of McLeod's glittering career when compared to Groom's.
  
Despite kicking 18 goals in 7 games for Fremantle, Groom was surprisingly dropped 4 times. When not selected he played for West Perth, kicking 70 goals in 14 games including 5 goals in their premiership win over Subiaco.

After being delisted by Fremantle at the end of the 1995 season, he was selected by North Melbourne in the 1995 AFL Draft. However a week before the 1996 season started, he sustained a knee injury requiring a total knee reconstruction. Unfortunately 5 months later the same knee buckled again and a second reconstruction was required; this in a season which saw North Melbourne take out both the reserves and senior premiership.

After missing the he managed to play Ssenior football with North Melbourne and was a member of the 1998 Ansett Australia Cup winning team. He retired from AFL football at the end of 1998 due to injuries but went on to play. He firstly played for the West Preston Lakeside Football Club in the Diamond Valley League, and then the Melbourne University Football Club in the Victorian Amateur Football Association (VAFA).

In 2011, he came out of retirement to play three games for the Chicago United Football Club in the Mid American Australian League 2011 Madison Invitational Tournament. He played in games against the Milwaukee Bombers, Minnesota Freeze, and Cincinnati Dockers, finishing with 10 goals and at least 10 behinds, helping Chicago United to a 2-1 record and 3rd-place finish.

References

External links

Adelaide Football Club players
Fremantle Football Club players
North Melbourne Football Club players
South Adelaide Football Club players
West Perth Football Club players
1973 births
Living people
Australian rules footballers from South Australia
University Blacks Football Club players
Christies Beach Football Club players